Boško Kajganić (29 April 1949 – 21 November 1977) was a Yugoslav footballer. He died in a car accident in 1977, at the age of 28.

Personal life
His son, Ognjen Kajganić, is a retired professional handball player.

References

1949 births
1977 deaths
Yugoslav First League players
Red Star Belgrade footballers
FK Vardar players
Galatasaray S.K. footballers
Association football goalkeepers
Yugoslav footballers
Yugoslav expatriate footballers
Expatriate footballers in Turkey
Road incident deaths in Turkey
People from Odžaci